Farmers is an unincorporated community in the southwest corner of Franklin Township, Owen County, in the U.S. state of Indiana. It lies just south of US Highway 231 at the intersection of 650 West, which is a community about twelve miles south of the city of Spencer, the county seat of Owen County.  Its elevation is 591 feet (180 m), and it is located at  (39.1753222 -86.8916741). This community is also known as Farmers Station.

History
A post office was established as Farmers Station in 1869, renamed Farmers in 1882, and remained in operation until it was discontinued in 1931. Farmer was the surname of a town merchant.

Geography
 This community is on the western banks of the White River.
   U.S. Route 231 is just north of this community.
 McIndoo Cemetery is in this community on Hickam Road, between the railroad tracks and the river, and is located at  (39.1767112 -86.8744515).

School districts
 Spencer-Owen Community Schools, including a high school.

Political districts
 State House District 46
 State Senate District 39

References

External links
 Roadside Thoughts for Farmers, Indiana

Unincorporated communities in Owen County, Indiana
Unincorporated communities in Indiana